Reginald Dalton (19 July 1896–1979) was an English footballer who played in the Football League for Coventry City.

References

1896 births
1979 deaths
English footballers
Association football forwards
English Football League players
Coventry City F.C. players
Halifax Town A.F.C. players
Nuneaton Borough F.C. players